The year 1989 was the 18th year after the independence of Bangladesh. It was also the eighth year of the Government of Hussain Muhammad Ershad.

Incumbents

 President: Hussain Muhammad Ershad
 Prime Minister: Moudud Ahmed (until 12 August), Kazi Zafar Ahmed (starting 12 August)
 Chief Justice: F.K.M. Munim (until 30 November), Badrul Haider Chowdhury (starting 1 December)

Demography

Climate

Economy

Note: For the year 1989 average official exchange rate for BDT was 32.27 per US$.

Events

 25 January – At Pubail, Gazipur District, a northbound mail train collides head-on with an express going to Chittagong and several cars roll off an embankment into a rice paddy.  At least 110 are killed and thousands injured.
 9 April - Munir Hussain, a wealthy industrialist, kills his wife Sharmin Rima after only four months of marriage. The murder and subsequent trial generates widespread public comment.
 26 April - A tornado struck Manikganj District destroying around 90 percent of homes in 153 villages. The death-count was almost 600.
 6 September - Gruesome murder of Birajabala Debnath and her children was committed by a mob at the village of Nidarabad under Harashpur Union of Nasirnagar Upazila in Brahmanbaria District.
 30 October - Apparently as a reaction to the laying of the foundation of Ram temple adjacent to the disputed structure in Ayodhya in India, Hindu shops were looted and set on fire in Chittagong, in spite of a curfew. Hindu men and women were attacked and molested.
 11 November - An Islamist mob attacked Hindu shops and temples in Narsingdi. More than 25 Hindu-owned shops were set on fire and images in three temples were smashed.

Awards and recognitions

Independence Day Award

Ekushey Padak
 Shahed Ali (literature)
 Razia Mazid (literature)
 Mahmud Shah Koreshi (education)
 Mohammad Asafudowlah Reza (journalism)
 AKM Shahidul Huq (journalism)
 Abdur Razzak (fine arts)
 Amalendu Biswas (drama act)

Sports
 South Asian (Federation) Games:
 Bangladesh participated in the fourth South Asian Federation Games held in Islamabad from 20 to 27 October. With 1 gold, 12 silvers and 24 bronzes Bangladesh ended the tournament at the fifth position in overall points table.
 Domestic football:
 Abahani KC won Dhaka League title while Mohammedan SC became runner-up.
 Mohammedan SC won Bangladesh Federation Cup title.

Births
 20 March – Tamim Iqbal, cricketer
 1 August – Abdullah Hel Baki, sports shooter
 1 August – Reasat Islam Khaton, footballer
 17 December – Sunny Sanwar, artist and social activist

Deaths
 20 January – Alamgir Kabir, film director (b. 1938)
 7 April – Amena Begum, politician (b. 1925)
 23 September – Abu Hena Mustafa Kamal, author (b. 1936)
 19 November – Mohammad Abdul Jalil, freedom fighter (b. 1942)

See also 
 1980s in Bangladesh
 Timeline of Bangladeshi history

References